Syfy is a Latin American channel dedicated to science fiction and fantasy programming, owned by NBCUniversal International Networks, a division of NBCUniversal. The local version of the channel, available both in Spanish- and Portuguese-language feeds (for Spanish-speaking countries and for Brazil, respectively), was launched in 2007.
Until October 10, 2010, Syfy was known as Sci Fi.

The Brazilian feed of the channel, as well as its sister network, Studio Universal, is operated since mid-July 2012 by the joint venture between Universal Networks International and Grupo Globo-owned Canais Globo which already operated the Brazilian version of Universal TV.

Programming
12 Monkeys
Charmed
Face off
Grimm
Heroes
Lost
The Magicians
The Outpost
SurrealEstate
SyFy Games

References

External links
Syfy Latin America
Syfy Brazil

Syfy
Television channels and stations established in 2007
Science fiction television channels
Spanish-language television stations
Portuguese-language television stations in Brazil
Latin American cable television networks
Television networks in Brazil

pt:Syfy